The 2007 ADAC GT Masters season was the inaugural season of the ADAC GT Masters, the grand tourer-style sports car racing founded by the German automobile club ADAC. It began on 7 June at Nürburgring and finished on 14 October, at Hockenheim after six double-header meetings. Christopher Haase with help of Gianni Morbidelli and Jos Menten became the first series champion.

Race calendar and results

Standings

Footnotes

References

External links
 
 ADAC GT Masters on RacingSportCars

ADAC GT Masters season
ADAC GT Masters seasons